The 400 Sherbrooke West, is a 37-storey skyscraper in Montreal, Quebec, Canada.

It is an apartment complex and is located at the intersection of Sherbrooke Street and Bleury Street, near the Place-des-Arts Metro station and McGill University in the Quartier des Spectacles.

References

External links
Official website

Skyscrapers in Montreal
Downtown Montreal
Residential buildings completed in 2009
Apartment buildings in Quebec
Residential skyscrapers in Canada
2009 establishments in Quebec
Residential buildings in Montreal